Jay Blahnik is a fitness instructor, trainer, consultant, author, program developer, and the Vice President of Fitness Technologies for Apple Inc. Widely known as an authority on exercise and fitness issues as well as digital health and consumer behavior change, Blahnik has been a fitness expert for MSNBC.com and the Los Angeles Times and authored the book Full-Body Flexibility in 2004.

Fitness expert
Blahnik has produced and starred in a large number of fitness and workout videos and has consulted and represented a variety of prominent fitness equipment companies including Nike, Nautilus, Bowflex, Schwinn and Stairmaster.

Blahnik was a resident fitness consultant and contributor for MSNBC.com and NBCnews.com networks, and, in addition to authoring other books and articles, he has been a regular contributor on fitness and related topics for the Los Angeles Times.

Blahnik has also consulted as a topical expert on a variety of fitness issues ranging from technical instructions like treadmill techniques to strategic questions like what kinds of workout are appropriate at specific points in the fitness journey, and he has been consulted as an expert on careers in fitness. He has also published articles on the intersection of tech and fitness.

Blahnik was the Group Fitness Spokesperson for IDEA Health and Fitness Association, the largest association of fitness professionals in the United States. 
He was a member of Gatorade's G Series Fit Team, a BOSU® Development Team member, the program creator/developer for Schwinn Indoor Cycling, and an Advisor for Equinox Fitness Clubs.

Work with Nike
For over 18 years, Blahnik was a Nike contract athlete and Nike consultant. He worked closely with Nike on the launch of Nike+ Running, which has become the largest digital running community in the world, and was named one of the best tech gadgets and services in 2006 by Time Magazine.  He was also the original creator and program developer of the Nike Training Club App, and the Nike Training Club in-gym program.  He was also a key expert and consultant for many of Nike's Digital Sport initiatives including the Nike+ FuelBand and Nike+ Kinect Training.

Full-Body Flexibility
Published in 2004, Blahnik's book Full-Body Flexibility, provides techniques and strategies for creating and maintaining flexibility as part of a healthy workout routine and was a "critically acclaimed best seller." Full-Body Flexibility is now in its 2nd edition printing.

Awards
In 1996, Blahnik was selected as the International Instructor of the Year for the IDEA Health and Fitness Association, a global membership association for fitness and wellness professionals.  He was the youngest person to ever receive this award.  Blahnik was also selected as the Can-Fit-Pro International Fitness Presenter of the Year in 2006, and the Australian Fitness Network Fitness Instructor of the Year in 2012.  In 2019, Blahnik was selected as the recipient of the IDEA Jack LaLanne Award for Lifetime Achievement for making a significant and lasting contribution in the areas of health and fitness by promoting the benefits of exercise and healthy eating through his work in the media or public eye. In 2020, Blahnik was selected as one of the 26 most influential men in health and fitness by Men's Health magazine.

References

Living people
American exercise instructors
American consultants
Writers from California
People from Laguna Beach, California
Los Angeles Times people
Sportswriters from California
Nike, Inc. people
American educators
Year of birth missing (living people)
21st-century American educators
21st-century American writers